The list of ship launches in 1861 includes a chronological list of some ships launched in 1861.


References 

Sources
 

1861
Ship launches